Fatima Djibo Sidikou is a Nigerien diplomat. Having served in a variety of diplomatic posts in the United States and at the United Nations Office at Geneva, she is currently Niger's ambassador to Senegal.

Career 
Sidikou first joined the Ministry of Foreign Affairs in 1983.

From 2002 to 2012 she worked at the Nigerien Embassy in the United States, where she served as first counselor and chargé d'affaires. She also helped represent Niger at UNESCO from 2007 to 2012.

She became president of the Association of Pastoralists in Niger in 2012. The following year, she took over leadership of the Permanent Secretariat of the Rural Code, which supports agricultural producers.

Sidikou was appointed permanent representative of Niger to the United Nations Office at Geneva in 2015. She has also simultaneously served as Nigerien ambassador to Switzerland, Austria, and Liechtenstein.

In 2019, she succeeded the late  as Niger's ambassador to Senegal.

Personal life 
A Fulani, Sidikou is from a pastoralist community in northern Niger. She is married to fellow diplomat Maman Sambo Sidikou. They have two children.

References 

Living people
Nigerien women diplomats
Nigerien women in politics
Fula people
Ambassadors of Niger to the United States
Nigerien women ambassadors
Ambassadors of Niger to Senegal
Ambassadors of Niger to Switzerland
Ambassadors of Niger to Austria
Ambassadors of Niger to Liechtenstein
UNESCO
Year of birth missing (living people)